Setanta Sports Asia was an Asian pay television sports channel operating in the Asia Pacific region owned by Discovery Communications. It primarily airs the sports of rugby union and rugby league.

Setanta Sports Asia was available on TV platforms in Hong Kong, Indonesia, Malaysia/Brunei, Singapore, Thailand, Sri Lanka, Mongolia, the Philippines, and Taiwan.

History
In February 2011, Setanta Sports Asia launched in Hong Kong on Now TV, and in Malaysia and Brunei on Astro. In June 2015, Setanta Sports in Dublin confirmed it has sold its Asian operations to Discovery Communications.

From 29 January 2020, Setanta Sports Asia has been replaced by the new dedicated rugby channel, Rugby Pass TV which launched its OTT service first, since February 2016. Rugby Pass was later shut down due to the effects of the COVID-19 pandemic, and Premier Sports Asia took over the acquisition of all Rugby Pass subscribers in 2021.

Availability
The channel was available on the following platforms throughout Asia: 
 In Hong Kong via Now TV
 In Indonesia via First Media, Big TV, and MNC Play
 In Malaysia and Brunei on Astro
 In Mongolia via Univision and Sky Media
 In the Philippines on SkyCable
 In Thailand via TrueVisions
 In Singapore via Toggle
 In Sri Lanka via LBN, Dialog and SLT Peo TV
 In Taiwan via bbTV

Past coverage
Setanta was the leading broadcaster of rugby in Asia, covering a variety of competitions from the Northern and Southern hemispheres. Setanta's former Rugby rights were:

Rugby league 

 Super League
 RFL Championship
 National Rugby League (until 2017 season)

Rugby union

 International tests
Six Nations Championship (2011–2013 on Setanta; Return in 2017)
 The Rugby Championship (formerly Tri-Nations)
 Super Rugby
Pro14
Premiership Rugby
Ligue Nationale de Rugby
Top 14
Pro D2
 Mitre 10 Cup
 Currie Cup
 European Professional Club Rugby (2014–15 until 2017–18)
 European Rugby Champions Cup
 European Rugby Challenge Cup

GAA 
Setanta provided coverage of the Gaelic Athletic Association football and hurling championships.

See also
 Setanta Sports Eurasia
 Fox League

References

External links
 Setanta Sports Asia
 GAA on Setanta Sports Asia
 Rugby on Setanta Sports Asia
 NRL on Setanta Sports Asia
 TV Listings on Setanta Sports Asia

Sports television networks
Defunct television channels
Rugby union on television
Warner Bros. Discovery Asia-Pacific
Warner Bros. Discovery networks
Television channels and stations established in 2011
Television channels and stations disestablished in 2020